For Your Entertainment is the debut studio album by American singer Adam Lambert, which he started to record after the end of the eighth season of American Idol. It was released on November 23, 2009, by RCA Records. Three singles have been released from the album worldwide: "For Your Entertainment", "Whataya Want from Me" and "If I Had You" while "Sleepwalker" has been released in some countries as the fourth single. "Fever", "Sure Fire Winners" and "Aftermath" were released as radio-only singles in select countries. The album peaked at number three on the Billboard 200 and reached Gold and Platinum status in multiple countries. The album's second single "Whataya Want from Me" became an international hit reaching the top ten in fourteen countries. The album was supported by Lambert's first concert tour, the 2010 Glam Nation Tour.

Development
Immediately following his participation on American Idol, Lambert began writing and recording with predominant pop hit makers such as Lady Gaga, Greg Wells, Max Martin, Linda Perry, RedOne, Ryan Tedder, Evan "Kidd" Bogart, Sam Sparro, Kara DioGuardi, Alex James, Rivers Cuomo and Pink. On October 28, Lambert announced that the lead single would be "For Your Entertainment" produced by Dr. Luke. He tweeted, "Debut single is called 'For Your Entertainment' ..." He also confirmed a song called "Soaked" written by Matthew Bellamy of Muse and a song called "Music Again" written by Justin Hawkins of The Darkness.  Another song from Justin Hawkins titled "Suburban Decay" was also considered for the album, but Lambert decided not to record it, saying it was too different than the rest of the album. He also stated that he co-wrote six of the songs on the album: "Strut", "Pick U Up", " Voodoo, "Down The Rabbit Hole," "Aftermath" and "Broken Open". Lambert also announced through Twitter that he had collaborated with Lady Gaga. "Yes it's true: I spent yesterday in the studio with the insanely talented and creative Lady Gaga recording a song that she wrote! I love her." The guitar solo on the song "Sleepwalker" was performed by Orianthi.

Promotion
To promote the album's release, several songs from the album were performed live on AOL Sessions.  Following his controversial performance at the American Music Awards of 2009 (AMAs), Lambert was dropped from a few scheduled performances on the American Broadcasting Company (ABC) network, though CBS subsequently invited Lambert for an interview and performance on The Early Show in New York City instead. On November 25, 2009, Lambert performed his single "Whataya Want from Me" on the Late Show with David Letterman. He later appeared on The Tonight Show with Conan O'Brien on December 14, 2009, and performed his single. He provided another live performance two days later on the season finale of So You Think You Can Dance. Appearing with other superstar artists, Lambert's "Whataya Want from Me" stole the show, according to an MTV review. Earlier that day, he appeared on Chelsea Lately, with host Chelsea Handler.

Lambert appeared for the first time on The Jay Leno Show on December 21, 2009, giving a lengthy interview and performing "Whataya Want from Me".  He was invited back in March 2010 to close the second episode of The Tonight Show featuring Jay Leno, with a performance of the song "Sleepwalker" from his debut album. Lambert performed his newly released single "If I Had You" on Leno's May 21, 2010, show.  Lambert then went on a series of promotional interviews and performances to address the controversy, clear up rumours, discuss his rise to fame, and promote the album. Interviews included The Ellen DeGeneres Show, The View, and The Oprah Winfrey Show. On the March 10, Lambert performed on VH1's "Unplugged", where he sang stripped-down versions of songs off the album. During the spring of 2010, Lambert undertook a series of promotional interviews (TV and Radio) in Europe and Asia, to promote the international release of his album. A few days prior, he was interviewed for the Fuse TV "On the Record" segment. In March, as part of his swing through Australia to promote his album, he performed on "So You Think You Can Dance", as well as the popular morning show "Sunrise". Lambert also did a series of television appearances in Japan, as part of his Asian and European promotional tour.

In the same month, Lambert was selected to inaugurate the newly resurrected award-winning VH1 Unplugged concert series, for which he interviewed as well as performed stripped-down versions of five songs from the album. March 2010 also saw him as a featured artist on the ABC News Nightline "Playlist" segment, in which he discussed his musical influences and favorite tracks.

In May 2010, he returned to Ellen to perform a new single, "If I Had You".  Lambert performed an acoustic version of "Whataya Want from Me" on Ellen's February 10, 2011 show, soon after being nominated for a Grammy Award for his vocal performance of the song.  Lambert returned to the American Idol stage for the March 10, 2011, results show, singing an acoustic version of his song "Aftermath", accompanied only by guitar. After the performance, a dance remix version was made available for purchase, with proceeds benefitting The Trevor Project.

Release
The album was released in the United Kingdom, on November 20, 2009, and November 23 in the United States, to generally positive reception. The album was later released internationally with "Master Plan", "Down the Rabbit Hole", "Voodoo" and "Can't Let You Go" as bonus tracks. It was later released as a special Tour Edition in 2010, including the bonus tracks, live performances from iHeart Radio and AOL Stripped, music videos for "For Your Entertainment," "Whataya Want From Me," "If I Had You" and the making of "If I Had You"'s music video. The album was released with the same image of the title track artwork.

Critical reception

Critical response to For Your Entertainment was generally positive. At Metacritic, which assigns a normalized rating out of 100 to reviews from mainstream critics, the album has received an average score of 71, based on 10 reviews. The Huffington Post called the album "An instant classic" and also stated that "As a whole, For Your Entertainment marks one of the most impressive mainstream pop album debuts in recent memory." The Detroit News said that "It goes without saying that "For Your Entertainment" is the most poised debut from any "Idol" to date. Lambert has a vision and has successfully honed a sound that pays homage to his heroes while carving a niche for himself." Spin said the album is "perhaps the strongest, most flavorful batch of tunes to reach an AI vet, and Lambert's polymorphous vocal skills unite dancefloor strut and hard-rock pomp in a convincing glam package."

Slant Magazine wrote that "'Music Again' and the awkwardly written 'Strut' [are] every bit as obnoxious as the songs from Mika's The Boy Who Knew Too Much," and that "'Music Again' apes its production and a good deal of its melody from Mika's 'Touches You,' while the title track and lead single is so similar to Sam Sparro's 'Black and Gold' that 19 Entertainment should probably keep a strong legal team on retainer...but questions of originality aside, there's simply no getting around the fact that the Lady Gaga co-write 'Fever' and 'Whataya Want from Me,' written by Pink and Max Martin, are phenomenally well-crafted pop singles that give Lambert the opportunity to shine. To co-opt one of Simon Cowell's favorite phrases: Lambert's music sounds current in a way that Idol albums rarely do." Rolling Stone wrote that "The songs sound great but feel strangely stuffy — Entertainment seems like a disc that was overthought. Next time, the hugely talented Lambert should make sure he's going straight for the gut." In 2010, Adam Lambert was nominated for a GLAAD Media Award for "Outstanding Music Artist" for the album For Your Entertainment during the 21st GLAAD Media Awards.

Commercial performance
The album debuted at number 3 on the Billboard 200 selling 198,000 copies in its first week. The album was eventually certified gold by the Recording Industry Association of America (RIAA) for sales of over 500,000 copies. As of April 2015, it has sold 863,000 in the United States. In the UK, the album was first released on November 20, 2009, available only on imports, however it still managed to debut at number 80. The album was officially released on May 3, 2010, and debuted and peaked at number 36. For Your Entertainment was released across Europe between April and June, being successful mostly in Finland, Germany, Greece, and Sweden peaking at number 4, number 16, number 5 and number 8 respectively. The album was released in Australia on March 5, 2010, and debut inside the top 20 on the ARIA charts in its first week. After the success of singles "Whataya Want from Me" and "If I Had You" the album went on to be certified gold by ARIA, later being accredited platinum status for selling over 70,000 copies in Australia.

The album has received success across Asia, being certified gold in Malaysia and Singapore, with success in Japan also. As of January 2011, the album has sold over 1.2 million units worldwide, while all singles tracks from the albums have a sales total of 4.2 million units worldwide.

"Glam Nation" World Tour
In support of the album, Lambert embarked on his first headlining world solo tour entitled The Glam Nation Tour. The tour travelled across North America, New Zealand, Australia, Asia and Europe, before finishing with two final shows in Los Angeles, California. The tour began with a sold-out show at the Kirby Sports Center in Wilkes-Barre, Pennsylvania. Opening acts were Allison Iraheta and Orianthi for the North American leg of the tour.

Track listing

Charts

Weekly charts

Year-end charts

Certifications

Release date

References

External links
Official Adam Lambert For Your Entertainment song page

2009 debut albums
Adam Lambert albums
RCA Records albums
19 Recordings albums
Albums produced by Jeff Bhasker
Albums produced by Rob Cavallo
Albums produced by Ryan Tedder
Albums produced by Linda Perry
Albums produced by Dr. Luke
Albums produced by Greg Wells
Albums produced by Howard Benson
Albums produced by Max Martin
Albums produced by Shellback (record producer)